The 2012 ITF Women's Circuit – Yakima was a professional tennis tournament played on outdoor hard courts. It was the first edition of the tournament and was part of the 2012 ITF Women's Circuit. It took place in Yakima, Washington, United States, on July 9–15, 2012.

WTA entrants

Seeds 

 Rankings as of June 25, 2012

Other entrants 
The following players received wildcards into the singles main draw:
  Lauren Albanese
  Beatrice Capra
  Diana Ospina

The following players received entry from the qualifying draw:
  Jacqueline Cako
  Mayo Hibi
  Jana Nejedly
  Natalie Pluskota

The following players received entry by a Special Ranking:
  Zhou Yimiao

Champions

Singles 

  Shelby Rogers def.  Samantha Crawford 6–4, 6–7(3–7), 6–3

Doubles 

  Samantha Crawford /  Madison Keys def.  Xu Yifan /  Zhou Yimiao 6–3, 2–6, [12–10]

External links 
 
 2012 ITF Women's Circuit – Yakima at ITFtennis.com

ITF Women's Circuit - Yakima
Hard court tennis tournaments in the United States